The 2007–08 Midland Football Combination season was the 71st in the history of Midland Football Combination, a football competition in England.

Premier Division

The Premier Division featured 19 clubs which competed in the division last season, along with three new clubs:
Bartley Green, promoted from Division One
Heather Athletic, promoted from Division One, who also changed name to Heather St John's
Loughborough University, new club

League table

References

2007–08
10